Are You Kidding Me? No. is the third studio album by the Italian progressive metalcore band Destrage, released on March 4, 2014, by Metal Blade Records.

Track listing
All lyrics were written by Matteo Di Gioia and Paolo Colavolpe, and all music was written by Destrage.

Personnel
Destrage
Paolo Colavolpe – vocals
Matteo Di Gioia – guitar
Ralph Salati – guitar
Gabriel Pignata – bass
Federico Paulovich – drums
Additional performer
Ron "Bumblefoot" Thal – fretless guitar (track 10)

References

Destrage albums
Metal Blade Records albums
2014 albums